Vincent Bachet (born 29 April 1978 in Saint-Maurice-le-Girard, France) is a professional French ice hockey defenceman who participated at the 2010 IIHF World Championship as a member of the France National men's ice hockey team.

References

External links

1978 births
Living people
French ice hockey defencemen
Ice hockey players at the 2002 Winter Olympics
Olympic ice hockey players of France
Sportspeople from Vendée
Des Moines Buccaneers players
French expatriate sportspeople in the United States
Gothiques d'Amiens players